Francesco Antonio Porpora (1575–1640) was an Italian Roman Catholic prelate who served as Bishop of Montemarano (1635–1640).

Biography
Francesco Antonio Porpora was born in Naples, Italy in 1575. 
On 7 May 1635, he was appointed during the papacy of Pope Urban VIII as Bishop of Montemarano.
On 13 May 1635, he was consecrated bishop by Francesco Maria Brancaccio, Cardinal-Priest of Santi XII Apostoli, with Giacomo Theodoli, Bishop of Forlì and Alessandro Suardi, Bishop of Lucera, serving as co-consecrators. 
He served as Bishop of Montemarano until his death in 1640.

References

External links 
 (for Chronology of Bishops) 
 (for Chronology of Bishops)  

17th-century Italian Roman Catholic bishops
Bishops appointed by Pope Urban VIII
1575 births
1640 deaths